A partial solar eclipse will occur on Wednesday, July 11, 2029. A solar eclipse occurs when the Moon passes between Earth and the Sun, thereby totally or partly obscuring the image of the Sun for a viewer on Earth. A partial solar eclipse occurs in the polar regions of the Earth when the center of the Moon's shadow misses the Earth.

Images 
Animated path

Related eclipses

Solar eclipses 2026–2029

Metonic series

References

External links 

2029 in science
2029 07 11
2029 07 11